Stephenville may refer to:

 Stephenville, Newfoundland and Labrador, Canada
 Stephenville, Edison, New Jersey, United States
 Stephenville, Mississippi, United States
 Stephenville, Texas, United States

See also

 Stephenville Crossing
 Stephenville High School
 Stephenville International Airport